Tell Another Joke at the Ol' Choppin' Block is the second full-length album from New Jersey indie rock band Danielson Famile.

Track listing
 "A No No"  – 3:51
 "Ye Olde Battleaxe"  – 4:39
 "Me to Datee"  – 3:32
 "The Lord's Rest"  – 4:58
 "Flesh Thang"  – 2:26
 "Jersey Loverboy"  – 4:54
 "I Am My Beloved's"  – 2:19
 "Big Baby"  – 3:13
 "Deviled Egg"  – 4:23
 "Quest for Thrills"  – 4:30
 "Smooth Death"  – 3:19
 "Jokin' at the Block"  – 12:31

References

Danielson Famile albums
1997 albums
Tooth & Nail Records albums